There have been three major earthquakes near Indonesia in 2010:
April 2010 Sumatra earthquake
May 2010 Northern Sumatra earthquake
2010 Mentawai earthquake and tsunami

See also
List of earthquakes in Indonesia